Edward Elder may refer to:

Edward Elder (headmaster) (1812–1858), English teacher
Edward the Elder (c. 874-7 – 924), English king

See also